Ayr Pavilion (later Hanger 13) is a former music venue and multi-purpose hall in Ayr, Scotland, situated on Ayr's Low Green. As of 2020, it is used as "Pirate Pete's Family Entertainment Centre".

History 

Ayr Pavilion was built in 1911 after plans by architect James Kennedy Hunter. The auditorium had ca. 600 seats.

The pavilion hosted artists such as Iron Maiden, Gary Numan, Ian Gillan, Rory Gallagher and Faith No More. 

In the 1990s the building was used as a night club named Hanger 13. During the early 1990s raves became the target of much police and media interest after three alleged ecstasy-related deaths occurred. The club was eventually shut down, although there was a "unity campaign" to keep the venue open. The deaths may have been due to the use of more dangerous dance drugs such as PMA rather than MDMA.  Other factors included overheating, lack of drinking water and other amenities at these often ad hoc, unlicensed events. The tragic events that happened at Hangar 13 precipitated an amendment to the law that licences were required for the safeguarding of the health and safety of those attending similar events.

See also 

 List of electronic dance music venues

References

External links 

 Theatres Trust Database: Pavilion
 Pirate Pete's Family Entertainment Centre website

Buildings and structures in Ayr
Dance culture
Electronic dance music venues
Music venues in Scotland
Theatres completed in 1911